Bracknell Forest Council, also known as Bracknell Forest Borough Council is the local authority of Bracknell Forest in Berkshire, England. It is a unitary authority, having the powers of a non-metropolitan county and district council combined.

It consists of 42 councillors that are elected from 18 wards.

Premises
The council was originally based at Easthampstead House in Town Square, Bracknell, which had been built in 1970 for its predecessor authority, Easthampstead Rural District Council. In 1997 the council acquired additional office space in a modern building called Time Square on Market Street, Bracknell, with functions split between the two buildings for a time. Council meetings continued to be held at Easthampstead House until a new council chamber was created in Time Square in 2018, after which the council vacated Easthampstead House and is now solely based at Time Square.

See also 
 Bracknell Forest local elections

References

External links 
 Official website

Leader and cabinet executives
Unitary authority councils of England
Bracknell Forest
Local education authorities in England
Local authorities in Berkshire
Billing authorities in England